Azov Naval Base is the new naval base of the Armed Forces of Ukraine located in Berdiansk along the northern coast of the Azov Sea.

Base History
On September 11, 2018, Ukraine's Deputy Infrastructure Minister Yuri Lavrenyuk said that the first Gurza-M small armored artillery boat was deployed in the Sea of Azov.

On September 20, 2018, the Ukrainian military portal informed that A500 Donbas search and rescue vessel and A830 Korets seagoing tug left the western naval base of the Ukrainian Navy in Odessa in the direction of Berdiansk, where they would form the basis of the newly created naval base of the Ukrainian fleet on the Sea of Azov.

Following the 2018 Kerch Strait incident one tug and two artillery patrol boats were grabbed by the Russian Armed Forces, which also detained Ukrainian service members. In the summer of 2019, Russia exchanged Ukrainian sailors for a suspect connected with downing of the Malaysia Airlines Flight 17 (MH17) and in the fall of same year Russia returned Ukrainian boats before revival of international negotiations in the Normandie format framework.

List of assigned vessels

References

External links

Ukraine Navy facilities
Berdiansk
2018 establishments in Ukraine
Sea of Azov